"The One on the Right Is on the Left" is a country song written by Jack Clement. It was recorded by Johnny Cash on November 29, 1965, and included on his novelty album Everybody Loves a Nut (1966). It was the album's third and most successful single (see 1966 in music), reaching #2 on the U.S. Billboard Country Singles chart and #46 on Billboards Pop Singles chart.

Content
The song is a humorous criticism of musicians that put their political views into their music. It tells the story of a  folk song group that is "long on musical ability", but ultimately breaks up due to political differences.
At the end of the song, a warning is given not to mix politics with one's music.

The punch line to the joke is that "the guy in the rear", is less easily labeled: he is a Methodist and he burned his driver's license (rather than his draft card), etc. Indeed, the song closes by stating that he got drafted.

Track listings

Chart performance

Cover versions
The song was covered, with a few lyrics slightly modified, by Canadian punk rock band Youth Youth Youth on their 1982 demo as well as on their Repackaged LP released in 1989 on Fringe Records.

Noel Harrison sang the song on The Smothers Brothers Comedy Hour on June 11, 1967. They ended the song by pointing out they had no "guy in the rear" and walked off.

References

External links
[ Johnny Cash Billboard Singles], Allmusic.

1966 songs
Johnny Cash songs
1966 singles
Songs written by Jack Clement
Columbia Records singles
Song recordings produced by Don Law